CD98 is a glycoprotein that is a heterodimer composed of SLC3A2 and SLC7A5 that forms the large neutral amino acid transporter (LAT1).  LAT1 is a heterodimeric membrane transport protein that preferentially transports branched-chain (valine, leucine, isoleucine) and aromatic (tryptophan, tyrosine, phenylalanine) amino acids.  LAT is highly expressed in brain capillaries (which form the blood–brain barrier) relative to other tissues.

A functional LAT1 transporter is composed of two proteins encoded by two distinct genes:
 4F2hc/CD98 heavy subunit protein encoded by the SLC3A2 gene 
 CD98 light subunit protein encoded by the SLC7A5 gene

See also
 Cluster of differentiation
 Transmembrane protein
 Transport protein
 Solute carrier family

References

External links
 
 
 

Clusters of differentiation
Solute carrier family